Yolanthe Cabau ( Cabau van Kasbergen; 19 March 1985) is a Spanish-Dutch actress, model and television host.

Early life
Cabau was born on the Spanish island of Ibiza. Her father, Xavier Cabau (1954–2007), was Spanish, while her mother, Richarda "Rici" van Kasbergen, is Dutch. Xavier Cabau was a wealthy entrepreneur known as the "King of Ibiza", who owned several discothèques, restaurants, and bars. Cabau's childhood in Spain was marked by domestic violence, after her father experienced financial problems and became addicted to drugs. When she was five years old, her mother moved with her children to her native Netherlands. She has seven siblings, as well as five half-siblings from her father's second marriage. After graduating from high school at the age of 17, Cabau decided to pursue an acting career.

Career
Cabau appeared in the Dutch productions Snowfever (2004) and Costa! (2005). From 2005 to 2008, she had a recurring role in the soap opera Onderweg naar morgen. In 2006, Cabau starred in the short film Turkse chick, which was nominated for a Gouden Kalf, the Dutch equivalent of an Academy Award. The film contained a controversial sex scene to which Cabau received public backlash. She later admitted that she regrets doing the scene. A real-life WAG, she appeared in the third season of the dramedy Voetbalvrouwen, similar to the British series Footballers' Wives. In 2006, 2007, and 2009, Cabau was voted the "Sexiest Dutch Woman" by the Dutch FHM.

Personal life
Cabau was dating singer Jan Smit from January 2007 till May 2009. They ended their relationship a few days after Cabau was photographed with football player Wesley Sneijder. Cabau and Sneijder were married on 17 July 2010 in Tuscany, Italy, six days after Sneijder played the final of the FIFA World Cup. The couple has one son. Following her marriage, she changed her surname from Cabau van Kasbergen to Sneijder-Cabau, which she also uses professionally.

Cabau is a co-founder and ambassador of Stop Kindermisbruik, a foundation which aims to put an end to child sexual abuse in developing countries. Stop Kindermisbruik engages in actions such as freeing child prostitutes, preventing children from becoming child prostitutes, and helping freed children cope with the trauma they endured.

On March 5, 2019, the couple announced their decision to split up, but made it clear that there was not (yet) going to be a divorce. Yolanthe stopped using the name Sneijder-Cabau and refers to herself now as Yolanthe Cabau.

Filmography

Film

Television

References

External links
 

1985 births
Dutch film actresses
Dutch female models
Dutch expatriates in Spain
Dutch television actresses
Dutch people of Spanish descent
Living people
People from Ibiza
De Trap Theater Academy alumni
21st-century Dutch actresses
Dutch soap opera actresses
Nationaal Songfestival presenters